The 2008 OFC Under 20 Qualifying Tournament was held in Papeete, Tahiti. The tournament was won by hosts Tahiti after their final win against Fiji and a 2–2 draw between New Caledonia and New Zealand which prevented either team from qualification and was the first tournament since 1974 to be won by a nation that was not Australia or New Zealand.
As champions, Tahiti qualified for the 2009 FIFA U-20 World Cup.

Participating teams

Squads

Group stage

Round 1

Round 2

Round 3

Winner

Goal scorers
2 goals

 Alan Hnautra (NCL)
 Jean Wahnyamalla (NCL)
 Greg Draper (NZL)
 Costa Barbarouses (NZL)

1 goal

 Roy Kayara (NCL)
 Adam McGeorge (NZL)
 Jonathan Raj (NZL)
 Garry Rochette (TAH)
 Ariihau Teriitau (TAH)
 Alvin Tehau (TAH)
 Hiva Kamoise (TAH)

See also
2009 FIFA U-20 World Cup

References

OFC U-20 Championship
Under 20
International association football competitions hosted by French Polynesia
Beach
2008 in youth association football